In anatomy, the ileal vessels are the arteries and veins which supply or drain the ileum, the final section of the small intestine.

These are:
 Unnamed branches of the superior mesenteric artery (see also intestinal arteries)
 Unnamed tributaries of the superior mesenteric vein

Arteries
Veins
Abdomen